Whiddon Lake is a lake in Thunder Bay District, Ontario, Canada. The primary outflow is an unnamed creek that joins the Whitesand River at a point between the mouth of Blackett Creek upstream and Whitesand Lake downstream.

References

Lakes of Thunder Bay District